Achille Perilli (28 January 1927 – 16 October 2021) was an Italian painter and sculptor.

Biography
Born in Rome on 28 January 1927, Achille Perilli attended classical secondary school and earned a degree in literature with a thesis on Giorgio de Chirico. After World War II, he founded the group Forma 1 alongside Carla Accardi, Ugo Attardi, Pietro Consagra, and Giulio Turcato. He was a master in abstractionism, as seen in his exhibitions at the Venice Biennale in 1952, 1958, 1962, and 1968. From 1948 to 1986, he participated in the Rome Quadriennale on five separate occasions. From 1963 to 1964, he participated in the touring exhibition Peintures italiennes d'aujourd'hui in Beyrouth, Damas, Teheran, Ankara and Tunis. In 1995, he became a member of the Accademia di San Luca and received the award from the President of the Republic of Italy Oscar Luigi Scalfaro in 1997.

Perilli died in Orvieto on 16 October 2021.

References

1927 births
2021 deaths
20th-century Italian painters
21st-century Italian painters
20th-century Italian sculptors
21st-century Italian sculptors
Painters from Rome
Abstract painters
Abstract sculptors
Italian contemporary artists